The Earl G. Maxwell Arboretum is a  arboretum and botanical garden located on the East Campus of the University of Nebraska–Lincoln in Lincoln, Nebraska.

The arboretum began more than 50 years ago when Earl G. Maxwell began to plant trees on the campus. It was subsequently dedicated as the second site of the Nebraska Statewide Arboretum.

Mature oaks include specimens of black, bur, English, pin, sawtooth, shingle, shumard, and swamp white varieties. Other trees include blue ash, chestnut, pawpaw, sweetgum, black tupelo, and Scots pine. Additional plants include lilacs, cold-hardy rhododendrons, and viburnums, as well as over 80 hosta cultivars, and a  prairie with native wildflowers and bluestem and Indian grass.

External links
Maxwell Arboretum official site

See also
 List of botanical gardens in the United States

Botanical gardens in Nebraska
Arboreta in Nebraska
University of Nebraska–Lincoln
Geography of Lincoln, Nebraska
Protected areas of Lancaster County, Nebraska
Tourist attractions in Lincoln, Nebraska